The acronym BWL means:

U.S. Army Biological Warfare Laboratories
Internet slang for "Bursting with laughter" (See LOL)
British Workers League
Birch Wathen Lenox School in New York City
Lambert, W. G., Babylonian Wisdom Literature, sometimes cited in academic papers on the Book of Job
ICAO airline code for defunct airline British World Airlines
IBM Blueworks Live - a business process modelling tool sold by IBM